The Guardians of Time is an art project of the Austrian sculptor Manfred Kielnhofer.

Idea and history 
The Guardians of Time were developed by the artist Manfred Kielnhofer, who is sure that mankind is watched and protected by strange characters. The designer and photographer were always interested in the human being as a model as well as a potential source of danger to mankind. In 2006 he created the first life-size "Time Guardians" to be part of the Skulpturenpark Artpark in Linz. The sculpture reminds us of a monk. The artist uses the human form as a tool, either on a canvas or in a sculpture. During the following years, Kielnhofer put his time guardians in public places like in front of ancient castles, squares, old mines, or parks. They traveled to several countries and were part of many exhibitions. In his works of art, Manfred Kielnhofer deals with the natural human desire for security. Thus his oeuvre reflects genuine exploration, consideration, and discussion of current as well as historic moods and sensibilities of his social environment.
The message is, that people should never forget that they are always watched by power, that is stronger than mankind.
In 2012 Kielnhofer designed the Mini guards, 54x36x34cm, 1 kg, as a limited edition, they are signed and made of plastic. In various colors, they can be illuminated from within. One of the Mini guards was ordered by Peter Weibel for the ZKM in 2012. Guardians of Time Settle in During Art Dubai 2013.  First cast bronze guardian of the art foundry Krismer. In 2014 the ancient giant people statues 220x220x220cm guardians are shown at the Festival of Lights in Berlin. The guardians are shown by the 56th Venice Biennale Of Art, Collateral Event – Personal Structures, Time Space Existence at the Palazzo Mora. First works with the glass Berengo Studio Murano Venice. A fine empty coat was made of white Carrara marble by Studio Massimo Galleni in 2016.

Exhibitions 
 2006–2007. Gallery Artpark Linz – Skulpturenpark Artpark, Gallery Fotopark Linz, Time guardians on tournee
 2008. Egon Schiele Art Centrum (CZ), Gallery Fontaine Amstetten, Black Box Gallery Copenhagen/Linz, art garden Graz;
 2009. Cass Sculpture Fondation (UK), Art Vilnius together with Martina Schettina, Franz West and :de:Herbert Brandl, Artfair Berlin-Arttower, Galerie Seywald Salzburg, Mobile-Galerie Hörsching, Woka Lamps Vienna
 2010. Castle Schloss Steyregg near Linz, Neuköllner Kunstsalon Berlin, Galerie Kunst und Handel Graz, Kunstraum Ringstrassen, Light Art Biennale Austria 2010, Galerie Claudiana, Area 53 vienna, Citygalerie, Kunsthandel Freller
 2011. Galerie Thiele Linz, Nord Art Germany, Kunstprojekt "ghost car" zur Art Basel, Liste, Scope, Volta Show, Festival of Lights Berlin, Grevenbroich Inseln des Lichtes, Kunsthaus Tacheles Berlin, Kunstverein Passau, ArtStays Ptuj Slovenia, Time guards on tour in Venice
 2012. Designmonat Graz, Galerie Bachlechner, Sculpture show Castle Hartberg "Slow", Ferryman Ferry Basel public Art Basel show, Occupy movement DOCUMENTA (13) Kassel Time guards, Festival of Lights Berlin, Art & Antiques fair vienna sculpture garden
 2013. Galerie Liebau Burghaun Fulda, Phantasten Museum Wien, Guardians of Time Settle in During Art Dubai, VBKW Künstlerparade Stuttgart, Phantasten Museum Wien, public art show Venice Biennale, SCOPE Art Show Basel Galerie Kunst und Handel, Art Bodensee Galerie Galerie Bachlechner, Austrian contemporary sculptures castle Tabor, Festival of Lights Berlin, art and antiques vienna fair, Kunstmesse Fulda Galerie Liebau, IC contemporary Istanbul art project Galerie Kunst und Handel Graz vienna, Wikam Art&Antiques fair vienna sculpture garden Galerie Kunst und Handel, Art&Antique vienna Hofburg Kunsthandel Freller
 2014. Wiener internationale Kunst & Antiquitätenmesse Kunsthandel Freller, Art&Antique Residenz Salzburg Kunsthandel Freller, Skulpturensommer Galerie Liebau, WIKAM im Schloss Laxenburg Galerie Szaal, Highlights Art Basel public art, Kunst in der Fabrik II im GIZ Rosegg Galerie Kunst und Handel, public art Brussels and Amsterdam, ART Bodensee Galerie Galerie, Art Stays Festival Ptuj Slovenia, Art Salzburg Kunsthandel Freller, Woodlands Waterway Arts Bench Competition, Texas USA, Festival of Lights Berlin, WIKAM Galerie Kunst und Handel, Art&Antique Hofburg Vienna Kunsthandel Freller
 2015. 56th Venice Biennale Of Art, Collateral Event – Personal Structures, Time Space Existence, Palazzo Mora, TRIO Biennial Three-dimensional Rio de Janeiro Biennial, ArtPrize Grand Rapids, Michigan USA
 2016. 4th Dubai art award, ArtPrize ArtPrize Grand Rapids Michigan USA, Susan Mains gallery Grenada, Galerie am Museum in Frauenau, Festival of Lights Berlin, Artigo Rio de Janeiro art fair, Light festival Kolding Denmark
 2017. Spotlight Festival Bucharest RO, Muralharbor Linz A, Museum Modern Art Hünfeld D, Guerilla art Documenta Kassel, ArtPrize ArtPrize Grand Rapids Michigan USA, Swell Sculpture Festival Gold Coast AU, Festival of Lights Berlin, Kunst Zürich, Beijing China TaiKooLi mall
 2018. Toronto Light Fest, arte in fiera Italia - Kunst und Handel gallery, Lightart Zwickau, Swiss Triennial Festival of Sculpture Bad RagARTz, PAN Awareness Projekt #TheEyeofGuardian Ghana Afrika, Galerie Spittelberg Passage, Festival of Lights Berlin, Biennale Arte Salerno Italia, Tabakfabrik Linz
 2019. Toronto Light Fest, artvienna wikam art dealer Freller, Lichtgalerie Cottbus, PAN Austria Galerie, Gleis21 Dietikon Swiss,
 2020. Stadtplatz Steyr, Exhibition of three golden statues on the historic town square, purchased by the local government

Publications 
 2006: in the online database of MAK Museum of Applied Arts (Vienna) Design-Info-Pool-Online
 2006: Manfred Kielnhofer. Exhibition Catalogue Artpark digitalprint Linz, Gallery ARTpark Lenaupark City Linz.
 2007: Time guardians Exhibition Catalog digitalprint Linz, Gallery ARTpark Lenaupark City Linz.
 2008: Masters Contemporary Arts, Collectible Global Art Book 
 2008: Trends Contemporary Arts, Collectible Global Art Book 
 2009: Cass Sculpture Foundation (UK) Manfred Kielnhofer's Timeguards, the Foundation's newest arrivals
 2011: NordArt, Kunstwerk Carlshütte 
 2011: Festival of Lights, Berlin Impressionen
 2011: 500 x Art in Public, Chris van Uffelen, Braun publishing 
 2012: Kunstforum Bd. 217 dOCUMENTA (13), Ein Rundgang, page 80,81
 2012: ST/A/R Printmedium Wien – Berlin, page 58
 2012: Berliner Morgenpost cover page, Festival of Lights
 2013: Ice Contemporary Istanbul art fair magazine page 41-45

References

Press 
 Catalogue Timeguards Gallery Artpark (PDF-file; 3,14 MB)
 Kielnhofer at Gallery Artpark (PDF-file; 2,10 MB)
 S/T/A/R arts collection at Gallery Artpark (PDF-file; 1,96 MB)
 story at Austria Journal 8/2008 (PDF-file; 171 kB)
 European-art.net | Manfred Kielnhofer
 Ice Contemporary Istanbul art fair magazine page 41-45

External links 

 official Website

Austrian art
Installation art works
Outdoor sculptures